Andrew Heeps (15 December 1899 – 1981) was a Scottish professional football centre half who played in the Scottish League for Dumbarton and Airdrieonians.

Career statistics

References

Scottish footballers
English Football League players
Brentford F.C. players
Footballers from Stirling
Association football central defenders
Dunfermline Athletic F.C. players
Airdrieonians F.C. (1878) players
Scottish Football League players
1899 births
Camelon Juniors F.C. players
Bo'ness F.C. players
Dumbarton F.C. players
Scottish expatriates in New Zealand
1981 deaths